A Prince for Christmas is a 2015 American made-for-television Christmas romantic drama film produced and directed by Fred Olen Ray and starring Viva Bianca, Kirk Barker and Aaron O'Connell.  The film was originally called Small Town Prince and premiered on Starz network on November 29, 2015.

Storyline
The king and queen of the European kingdom of Balemont (Maxwell Caulfield and Kelly Le Brock) arrange a marriage for their son and heir, Prince Duncan (Kirk Barker) fixing the wedding for Christmas Day, however, Duncan is dismayed and a week before the unhappy day he runs away incognito to the small town of Aurora in the United States, changing his name to David. Arriving there in the snow, he goes for a meal in a diner and literally bumps into Emma (Viva Bianca) a single woman who owns and operates the business, who has just broken up with her intended, Todd (Aaron O'Connell), Emma is also responsible for looking after her teenage sister, Alice, as their parents have both died.

David dates Emma and falls in love, however, after a whirlwind romance, Emma finds out who David really is from a newspaper article about the imminent wedding of Prince Duncan to Isabelle de Montavia and she angrily sends him away. He returns home to Balemont, but persuades his parents to cancel the planned wedding, and on Christmas Eve he returns for Emma.

Todd, a car salesman, remains interested in Emma. On discovering that Duncan has wooed her while about to marry Isabelle, Emma has the notable line "Two men in my life, and the honest one turns out to be the used car salesman!"

Reception
The Movie Scene calls the film "another movie which reworks the Prince from Europe masquerading as a normal guy in America and meeting a young woman who inevitably works in the small town diner." However, its review goes on to welcome embellishments to the storyline, with Emma looking after her sister and not celebrating Christmas, which was when their parents had both died. It also calls the film "visually beautiful", with snow covered streets and wood-panelled interiors, describes Barker and Bianca as having a lot of eye appeal, and applauds Barker's well-spoken but unpompous prince, so that the film "does deliver a picture perfect look of a small town at Christmas with plenty of snow and Christmas decorations."

Cast
Viva Bianca as Emma
Kirk Barker as Prince Duncan
Aaron O'Connell as Todd
Maxwell Caulfield as King of Balemont
Kelly LeBrock as Queen Ariana
Mark Lindsay Chapman as Geoffrey
Brittany Beery as Alice
Wendy Egloff as Wendy
Gregory Nyburg as Skate Attendant
Richard Lounello as Kenny

Allusions
A line in the film spoken by Emma, "Snow melts, lights go down, it's all just an illusion", is used as a chapter heading in Lauren Rosewarne's study Analyzing Christmas in Film: Santa to the Supernatural (2017).

See also
 List of Christmas films

Notes

External links 
 
 A Prince for Christmas trailer at youtube.com

2015 television films
2015 films
2015 romantic drama films
2010s Christmas drama films
American Christmas drama films
American romantic drama films
Christmas television films
Films about princes
Films directed by Fred Olen Ray
Films set in Europe
Films set in New York (state)
Films shot in New York (state)
Erie County, New York
American drama television films
2010s English-language films
2010s American films